Bangladesh Cartoonist Association (BANCARAS) is an organization of the cartoonists of Bangladesh established in January 2011. The aim of the organization is to work as a common platform for countrywide cartoonists. BANCARAS keeps cartoonists connected by gathering with the work and thought of them. BANCARAS plans to arrange several cartoon exhibitions every year focusing different issues, as well as regular cartoon workshops.

Platform 

Nowadays cartoon is a very popular media in Bangladesh. But it was not so popular as it is now when it  was just innovated in Bangladesh. First Bangladeshi cartoonist was Kazi Abul Kashem who started to draw cartoons in a magazine named "shawgat" in 1930s. In 1971s liberation war Quamrul Hassans cartoon "ei janowarder hotta korte hobe" influenced the freedom fighters deeply. In 1978, satire magazine Unmad published and got a high popularity among the people. In 80s and 90s editorial cartoons was getting popularity in the general people by the newspapers. After 2000 there increases a number of amateur cartoonist grew up from the young generation. Nowadays Bangladesh has a big number of newspapers where cartoon is a very popular section. To gather all the cartoonists on a common platform bring the BANCARAS to its birth.

History 
BANCARAS established in January 2011 by organizing a cartoon exhibition, however its official work was started earlier by a gathering of some junior cartoonist at Unmad office presided by the Editor of Unmad Ahsan Habib (cartoonist) in June 2010.

Cartoon exhibition 2011 
Bangladesh Cartoonist Association had arranged their 1st cartoon exhibition on 9–11 January 2011. At National Press Club compound a three-day exhibition was a big success with thousand of viewers. With this exhibition Bangladesh Cartoonist Association started its voyage ceremonially.

Executive body

References

External links 
 Bangladesh Cartoonist Association

Art and design-related professional associations

2011 establishments in Bangladesh
Trade associations based in Bangladesh
Labour relations in Bangladesh